Camacostoma is a genus of moths in the Carposinidae family. It contains the single species Camacostoma mesosapra, which is found in New Guinea.

References

Natural History Museum Lepidoptera generic names catalog

Carposinidae